The Baldwin Rocks are a group of rock outcrops about  northwest of Watson Bluff on the north side of David Island. They were charted by the Australasian Antarctic Expedition, 1911–14, under Mawson, and named by him for Joseph M. Baldwin of the Melbourne Observatory.

References 

Rock formations of Queen Mary Land